Życzkowski (feminine: Życzkowska, plural: Życzkowscy) is a Polish surname. Notable people with the surname include:

Karol Życzkowski (born 1960), Polish mathematician and physicist
Michał Życzkowski (1930–2006), Polish technical professor 

Polish-language surnames